Anjula Singh Mahaur is an Indian politician of the Bharatiya Janata Party. She is a member of the 18th Uttar Pradesh Assembly, representing the Hathras Assembly constituency.

References 

Living people
Bharatiya Janata Party politicians
Members of the Uttar Pradesh Legislative Council
Uttar Pradesh MLAs 2022–2027
Year of birth missing (living people)